Prozzäk (also known as Simon and Milo) are a Canadian pop music duo consisting of Jay Levine and James Bryan McCollum. Their recordings and animated music videos tell the tale of two friends, Simon (Levine) and Milo (McCollum), who are in search of their true love. 

Since their formation in 1998, the duo have released four studio albums and received four Juno Award nominations. Prozzäk was also among the top 80 best-selling Canadian artists in Canada until 2016.

History
In the 1990s, Levine and McCollum were members of The Philosopher Kings, a Canadian R&B band. After a  physical altercation between them, they attempted to smooth things over by writing music together.  While on a European tour with the Kings, the two created a comedic song titled "Europa" in which they sang in British accents. The song did not fit in with the music produced by the Philosopher Kings, but the band's record company, Sony Canada, approved of it, so the two set aside their differences and created Prozzäk in 1998. The band name was inspired by the drug Prozac.

Their first album, Hot Show, was released in late 1998. The album featured the hit singles "Sucks to Be You" and "Strange Disease" and was certified triple platinum in Canada. Prozzäk was nominated for Best New Group at the 2000 Juno Awards, as well as being nominated for Best Album (Hot Show), Best Single ("Sucks to Be You"), and Best Video ("Strange Disease").  In 2000, Levine and McCollum wrote and produced several songs for Canadian pop group B4-4, including their hit song "Get Down". In late 2000, Prozzäk released their second album, Saturday People, on Epic Records. The album included the singles "www.nevergetoveryou" and "Be As". The album was certified gold in Canada and nominated for Best Pop Album at the 2002 Juno Awards. 

Prozzäk joined with Disney to increase promotion and released the album Ready Ready Set Go, also named Simon and Milo. It is a compilation of songs from their first two albums along with a new single, "Get a Clue" which was written for the TV movie Get a Clue starring Lindsay Lohan.

Prozzäk's next album, Cruel Cruel World was produced from MapleMusic in 2005. Cruel Cruel World was released on an independent label and did not receive as much promotion as their first two albums, and did not achieve the same success. Two songs were released online in 2006, "DJ-J-Vox" and "DJ (Calibe Remix)".

In 2008, the band released a song titled "Chloe the Chicken" on a kids' album titled Roll Play.

Reunions
After being inactive for several years, Prozzäk performed a reunion concert at the Atomic Lollipop Festival in Toronto on July 18, 2015, where they debuted a new single.

On September 18, 2015, Prozzäk released their first single in over ten years entitled "Baby I Need Your Love (Pussy Cat Pussy Cat)". This was followed by "Love Fools Anonymous" on June 15, 2016; in November that year they released "My Little Snowflake".

On February 3, 2017, Prozzäk released the single "Love Me Tinder" from an album in progress. An animated music video for the single debuted on March 17. Titled Forever 1999, the album was released on March 31, 2017.

In March 2018, the band attempted to launch Prozzak: Love Addicts, an animated series produced by Portfolio Entertainment and Duopoly.

In September 2018, Prozzäk toured across Canada with Aqua and Whigfield as part of the "Rewind Tour".

On September 9, 2019, Prozzäk announced that they would embark on their final tour titled the "Never Get Over You Farewell Tour". On May 22, 2022, Prozzäk reunited to perform at "Fizzfest" in Toronto, opening for Bran Van 3000.

Simon and Milo
Prozzäk are two animated characters named Simon and Milo. The creation of Simon and Milo initially began with accents suggested by the other members of The Philosopher Kings during their road trips. The cartoon characters designed by artist Scott Harder became a part of Prozzäk.

In The Prozzäk Story video, Simon and Milo are over 200 years old and were enemies in a previous life. Simon and Milo fought each other in a 20-year-old war called "Ochiyaki". During their battle with each other, a Great Unseen Voice projected down from the sky and told them they were to be best friends, sent through time to the 21st century, where they were given a mission. That mission was for the two to find true love through their music. The story is based on the formation of the duo.

In their music videos, Simon, a skinny character with jet-black hair and no neck, is in constant search of his true love, believing that the perfect woman is out there.  As a result, Simon ends up feeling depressed. Milo is a muscular blond character that accompanies Simon on his quest. Their introduction in the album Saturday People tells of their many visits to nightclubs and bars in hopes of finding true love, after which Simon gives up, and lies "face down in his own banana milkshake". Just then, the Great Unseen Voice from the heavens calls out, telling them that they have lost their way, and reminds them that only True Love holds the key to their destiny. Their music thus represents their social journey to find their true love.

Band members
Born in Toronto, Ontario, Levine is the lead singer of Prozzäk and the voice behind Simon. Through the music, Simon tells stories that represent Levine's actual life; for example, the song "Anna-Lisa" makes reference to his parents' divorce.  Levine has founded a company, Lefthook Entertainment, that helps artists market their music. He is also currently an artist under the name Today Kid.

McCollum is a guitarist who portrays Milo. He is the founder of UMI Entertainment based in Toronto. He also plays guitar for fellow Canadian recording artist Nelly Furtado.

Discography

Studio albums

Compilation albums
 Ready Ready Set Go (April 30, 2002) recorded by Hollywood Records

Singles

References

External links
 Prozzäk on Myspace
 
 Faze Articles -- Prozzak

Canadian pop music groups
Canadian dance music groups
Animated musical groups
Fictional characters invented for recorded music
Bands with fictional stage personas